Iodopepla is a genus of moths of the family Noctuidae.

Species
 Iodopepla alayoi Todd, 1964
 Iodopepla u-album (Guenée, 1852)

References
Natural History Museum Lepidoptera genus database
Iodopepla at funet

Hadeninae